The orange-tailed shadeskink or highland forest skink (Saproscincus rosei) is a species of skink found in New South Wales and Queensland in Australia.

References

Saproscincus
Reptiles described in 1985
Skinks of Australia
Endemic fauna of Australia
Taxa named by Richard Walter Wells
Taxa named by Cliff Ross Wellington